Jonathan Merlo (born 15 December 1998) is an Australian cricketer. He made his List A debut for Cricket Australia XI in the 2017–18 JLT One-Day Cup on 27 September 2017.

Career
In December 2017, he was named in Australia's squad for the 2018 Under-19 Cricket World Cup.

Merlo was in the Cricket Australia XI squad for the 2017–18 JLT One-Day Cup. He made his List A debut in the first match of the tournament when Cricket Australia XI won their second match in their existence against South Australia. He bowled seven overs with figures of 2/38 including a maiden over. He took his first List A wicket when he bowled Cameron Valente, who was on 100 at the time. He played four matches in the tournament and took a total of 5 wickets.

He made his Twenty20 debut for Melbourne Stars in the 2018–19 Big Bash League season on 1 January 2019. He made his first-class debut on 24 February 2020, for Victoria in the 2019–20 Sheffield Shield season.

Personal life
In 2022, Merlo was studying for a Bachelor of Commerce at Deakin University.

References

External links
 

1998 births
Living people
Australian cricketers
Place of birth missing (living people)
Cricket Australia XI cricketers
Melbourne Stars cricketers
Melbourne Renegades cricketers